Cullum is an unincorporated community in Kemper County, Mississippi, United States. A post office operated under the name Cullum from 1895 to 1914. In 1900, Cullum's population was 24.

References

Unincorporated communities in Kemper County, Mississippi
Unincorporated communities in Mississippi